Claremont is a city in Dodge County, Minnesota, United States. The population was 548 at the 2010 census.

History
A post office called Claremont has been in operation since 1856. Claremont was incorporated in 1878. The city took its name from Claremont Township.

Geography

Demographics

2010 census
As of the census of 2010, there were 548 people, 220 households, and 128 families living in the city. The racial makeup of the city was 93.1% White, 0.2% African American, 0.4% Asian, 5.1% from other races, and 1.3% from two or more races. Hispanic or Latino of any race were 15.0% of the population.

There were 220 households, of which 35.0% had children under the age of 18 living with them, 40.5% were married couples living together, 12.7% had a female householder with no husband present, 5.0% had a male householder with no wife present, and 41.8% were non-families. 32.3% of all households were made up of individuals, and 7.8% had someone living alone who was 65 years of age or older. The average household size was 2.49 and the average family size was 3.19.

The median age in the city was 33.5 years. 29.7% of residents were under the age of 18; 5% were between the ages of 18 and 24; 29.7% were from 25 to 44; 26.9% were from 45 to 64; and 8.8% were 65 years of age or older. The gender makeup of the city was 55.1% male and 44.9% female.

2000 census
As of the census of 2000, there were 620 people, 239 households, and 162 families living in the city. The racial makeup of the city was 85.00% White, 0.48% Native American, 12.10% from other races, and 2.42% from two or more races. Hispanic or Latino of any race were 16.61% of the population.

There were 239 households, out of which 37.2% had children under the age of 18 living with them, 53.1% were married couples living together, 10.9% had a female householder with no husband present, and 32.2% were non-families. 26.4% of all households were made up of individuals, and 10.0% had someone living alone who was 65 years of age or older.  The average household size was 2.59 and the average family size was 3.12.

In the city, the population was spread out, with 30.0% under the age of 18, 10.6% from 18 to 24, 30.3% from 25 to 44, 17.3% from 45 to 64, and 11.8% who were 65 years of age or older.  The median age was 31 years. For every 100 females, there were 111.6 males.  For every 100 females age 18 and over, there were 105.7 males.

The median income for a household in the city was $35,987, and the median income for a family was $36,750. Males had a median income of $32,375 versus $20,781 for females. The per capita income for the city was $15,498.  About 6.7% of families and 10.5% of the population were below the poverty line, including 10.9% of those under age 18 and 12.2% of those age 65 or over.

Education
Claremont High School's mascot was the Parrot. Their colors were orange and black.

In 1990, Claremont's school district merged with the towns of Dodge Center and West Concord to form Triton Public Schools. Dodge Center is now home to Triton Primary, Triton Middle School and Triton Senior High School. The first commencement exercises were held in 1991.

Triton's school mascot is the Cobra. The school colors are maroon and gray. The annual yearbook is titled Triton Tradition and the first volume was published in 1991.

Triton, coached by Don Henderson, won the Minnesota State Football championship in 1994 (B Division), 2000 (AA Division) and in 2006 (AA Division). In 2006, Triton's football team won every game in the AA Division. The 2006 Cobras hold a Minnesota State High School League Prep Bowl record for both the highest scoring team in a championship game (70 points), as well as total scoring game for both teams (91 points). Two members of the 1994 state championship team also hold individual Minnesota State High School League Prep Bowl records. Kirk Midthun ('96) for Most Touchdowns Passing (6) and Judge Gisslen ('95) for Most Touchdown Receptions (4 – record since tied). Source: http://www.mshsl.org Kirk Midthun was the Minnesota Player of the Year in 1994 and 1995 (a co-winner with Tim Rosga of Cretin Derham Hall).

References

External links

 City of Claremont Minnesota
 ePodunk: Profile for Claremont, Minnesota

Cities in Minnesota
Cities in Dodge County, Minnesota
Rochester metropolitan area, Minnesota